This is a comprehensive list of Camorra clans and their place of origin. A clan is a basic unit in the Camorra, a criminal organization originating in Campania. Currently it is estimated there are about 111 Camorra clans, and about 7,000 full members.

Province of Avellino

Quindici
Cava clan
Graziano clan

Province of Caserta

Casal di Principe
Casalesi clan
De Angelis, Taliercio clan (affiliates)

Maddaloni
Farina clan (defunct)

Marcianise
Belforte clan

Mondragone
La Torre clan (defunct)

Pignataro Maggiore
Lubrano-Ligato clan (defunct)

Metropolitan City of Naples

Afragola
Moccia clan
Magliulo clan (defunct)

Bacoli
Pariante clan

Castellammare di Stabia
D'Alessandro clan
Cesarano clan
Omobono-Scarpa clan (defunct)

Ercolano
Ascione clan
Birra clan (defunct)

Giugliano in Campania
Mallardo clan

Marano di Napoli
Abbinante clan
Nuvoletta clan (defunct)
Polverino clan
Orlando clan

Naples
Aprea-Cuccaro clan
Mazzarella clan
Giuliano clan (defunct)
Puccinelli clan
Cimmino clan
Contini clan
Lago clan (defunct)
De Luca Bossa clan
Sarno clan (defunct)
D'Amico clan (defunct)
Di Biasi clan (defunct)
Mariano clan
Di Lauro clan
Ricci clan
Russo clan (Quartieri Spagnoli) (defunct)
Lo Russo clan (defunct)
Terracciano clan
Pagnozzi clan
Potenza clan (defunct)
Rinaldi clan
Misso clan (defunct)
Perrella clan (defunct)
Licciardi clan
Sacco-Bocchetti clan

Nola 
Russo clan (Nola)

San Giuseppe Vesuviano
Fabbrocino clan

Poggiomarino
Galasso clan (defunct)

Pozzuoli
Beneduce-Longobardi clan

Portici
Vollaro clan

San Giorgio a Cremano
Abate clan (defunct)
Troia clan

Sant'Antimo
Puca clan
Verde clan
Ranucci clan (defunct)

Saviano
Alfieri clan (defunct)

Torre Annunziata
Gionta clan
Gallo-Cavalieri clan
Tamarisco clan

Boscotrecase/Boscoreale
Vangone-Limelli clan

Torre del Greco
Falanga clan
Gargiulo clan (defunct)

Province of Salerno

Battipaglia

 Pecoraro-Renna clan

Eboli

 Maiale clan

Salerno

 D'Agostino-Panella clan

Scafati

Matrone clan

References

 
Camorra clans